Eric Shelton (born June 23, 1983) is a former American football running back. He was drafted by the Carolina Panthers in the second round of the 2005 NFL Draft.  He played college football at Louisville.

Shelton has also been a member of the Washington Redskins.

Early years
Shelton attended Bryan Station High School in Lexington, Kentucky, where he played both running back and linebacker and twice earned state Class 4A Player of the Year honors.  He totaled 4,970 yards rushing with 59 touchdowns and 129 tackles with 11 sacks and 41 stops for losses during his career.  Shelton was a First-team USA Today and Parade All-American and was also an All-State track performer who competed in the high hurdles, triple jump and 4x100 relay.  It was in high school that he met his future wife Shamea. He was on Tom Lemming's Top 100 highschool recruits, ranked at #6 in the nation

College career

Florida State
Shelton started his collegiate career at Florida State University, where he played one season as a true freshman for the Seminoles.  He finished fourth on the team with 29 carries for 130 yards (4.5 avg.) but was disappointed with his playing time and decided to transfer to Louisville.  As a result of NCAA transfer rules, however, he was forced to sit out the 2002 season.

Louisville
Shelton attended the University of Louisville, and in his junior year (in 2004) he led the Cardinals in rushing (938 yards) and touchdowns (20).  His touchdown total tied the single season Louisville touchdown record (since broken by Michael Bush with 23 in 2005) and he also tied a Louisville record by rushing for five touchdowns in a game versus East Carolina University.  He ranked sixth in the nation with 120 points.  In 22 games with the Cardinals, he totaled 1,728 yards on 312 carries (5.5 avg) and had 30 touchdown runs.  His 30 touchdowns rank third all time at Louisville despite his only playing two years there.

Professional career

Carolina Panthers
Shelton was drafted in the second round (54th overall) of the 2005 NFL Draft by the Carolina Panthers with a pick they obtained from the Seattle Seahawks.  Shelton's NFL career got off to a rough start as he was placed on injured reserve at the beginning of the 2005 NFL season due to a broken foot.  In the 2006 season, Shelton rushed for 23 yards on only eight carries, and was activated in only eight games.  After a disappointing career with the Panthers he was released by them on September 1, 2007.

Washington Redskins
On January 9, 2008, the Washington Redskins signed Shelton to a future contract. He was waived/injured with a neck injury on July 30 and subsequently placed on injured reserve.  He was released with an injury settlement on August 15.

Personal life
Shelton and his wife Shamea had their wedding documented on episode six of the first season of My Big Fat Fabulous Wedding, a show on WE, Women's Entertainment Network.  The final cost for the Lexington, KY wedding was $270,000, funded by Shelton's endorsement money.

References

External links
Carolina Panthers bio
Louisville Cardinals bio
Washington Redskins bio
Tony Lemming's Top 100 High School Recruits

1983 births
Living people
American football running backs
Florida State Seminoles football players
Louisville Cardinals football players
Carolina Panthers players
Washington Redskins players
Players of American football from Lexington, Kentucky